Erwin Josef Ender (7 September 1937 – 19 December 2022) was a German prelate of the Catholic Church who spent his career in the diplomatic service of the Holy See. He was an archbishop and had the rank of nuncio since 1990.

Biography
Erwin Josef Ender was born on 7 September 1937 in Steingrund in Lower Silesia Province (now Kamienna, Poland). He spent his childhood there until the end of World War II when the region became part of Poland. The German population of Silesia was relocated and from 1945 on his family lived in Lüdinghausen in the German state of North Rhine-Westphalia.

As a seminarian Ender studied philosophy and theology at the Westfälische Wilhelms-Universität in Münster and then at the Pontifical Gregorian University and the Collegium Germanicum in Rome. He was ordained a priest of the Diocese of Münster on 10 October 1965. He received his doctorate from the Gregorian in 1970 with a thesis on the work of  John Henry Newman.

Ender then entered the diplomatic service of the Holy See on 10 August 1970 and worked until 1990 in the offices of the Secretariat of State.

On 15 March 1990, Pope John Paul II appointed him Titular Archbishop of Germania in Numidia  and gave him two diplomatic assignments: Apostolic Pro-Nuncio to Sudan and Apostolic Delegate to the Red Sea Region. On 5 April he received his episcopal consecration from the Pope. On 26 March 1992, his title changed from Delegate to the Red Sea Region to Delegate to Somalia. In Sudan in 1996, he accused the government of torturing a priest to extract a false confession of planning anti-government sabotage.

On 9 July 1997, John Paul named him Apostolic Nuncio to the Baltic States: Lithuania, Latvia, and Estonia. A month later, on 9 August, he was given the additional responsibility of Apostolic Administrator of Estonia.

On 19 May 2001, he was appointed Apostolic Nuncio to the Czech Republic.

On 25 November 2003, he was named Apostolic Nuncio to the Federal Republic of Germany.

On 15 October 2007, Pope Benedict XVI accepted Ender's resignation as Apostolic Nuncio in Germany and appointed Jean-Claude Périsset as his successor.

Pope Benedict named him a member of the Congregation for the Evangelization of Peoples on 9 May 2009. On 2011 he led the delegation of the Holy See to a United Nations-sponsored conference in Moscow on discrimination and persecution of Christians.

See also
 List of heads of the diplomatic missions of the Holy See

References

External links
Erwin Josef Ender at Catholic Hierarchy

1937 births
2022 deaths
People from Silesia
Apostolic Nuncios to Sudan
Apostolic Nuncios to Lithuania
Apostolic Nuncios to Estonia
Apostolic Nuncios to Latvia
Apostolic Nuncios to the Czech Republic
Apostolic Nuncios to Germany
Apostolic Nuncios to Somalia
Pontifical Gregorian University alumni
Cartellverband members
Grand Crosses with Star and Sash of the Order of Merit of the Federal Republic of Germany
People from the Province of Lower Silesia